Enock Atta Agyei (born 13 January 2005) is a Belgian professional footballer who plays as a winger for Mechelen on loan from Burnley.

Club career
Agyei started his career with RSC Verviers before joining Anderlecht in 2015. On 14 August 2022, he made his professional debut in the Challenger Pro League for Anderlecht's reserve side RSCA Futures. On 31 January 2023, he joined Championship side Burnley on a four-and-a-half year deal and was subsequently loaned out to Mechelen.

International career
Agyei has represented Belgium at youth international level up to up under-18 level.

Personal life
Agyei was born in Belgium to Ghanaian parents.

Career statistics

Notes

References

External links

2005 births
Living people
Belgian footballers
Association football wingers
RSCA Futures players
R.S.C. Anderlecht players
Challenger Pro League players
Belgian expatriate footballers
Belgian expatriate sportspeople in England
Burnley F.C. players
K.V. Mechelen players
Belgium youth international footballers
Belgian people of Ghanaian descent